Uyar may refer to:

People
Anıl Uyar (born 1980), Turkish ice hockey player and coach
Çağıl Uyar (born 1986), Turkish ice hockey player
Salih Uyar, a citizen of Turkey held in extrajudicial detention in Guatanamo Bay
Yücel Uyar (born 1960), Turkish football manager and former footballer

Places
Uyar Urban Settlement, a municipal formation which the district town of Uyar in Uyarsky District of Krasnoyarsk Krai, Russia is incorporated as
Uyar (inhabited locality), several inhabited localities in Russia

Other uses
UY-AR, ISO 3166-2 code for Artigas Department in Uruguay

See also
Uyarsky District, a district of Krasnoyarsk Krai, Russia